Jacott is a surname. Notable people with the surname include: 

Carlos Jacott (born 1967), American actor
Ruth Jacott (born 1960), Surinamese-Dutch singer

See also
Jacot